Omsukchansky District is an administrative district (raion), one of the eight in Magadan Oblast, Russia. As a municipal division, it is incorporated as Omsukchansky Urban Okrug. It is located in the eastern central part of the oblast. Its administrative center is the urban locality (an urban-type settlement) of Omsukchan. As of the 2010 Census, the total population of the district was 5,531, with the population of Omsukchan accounting for 75.2% of that number.

History
The territory of modern Omsukchansky District was originally a part of Severo-Evensky District. The split was formalized on July 16, 1954, which is considered the date of Omsukchansky District's foundation.

Geography
The Omsukchan Range, highest ridge of the Kolyma Mountains, rises in the district to the northwest of Omsukchan town. The Korkodon river flows across the district in its upper course.

Administrative and municipal status
Within the framework of administrative divisions, Omsukchansky District is one of the eight in the oblast. The urban locality (an urban-type settlement) of Omsukchan serves as its administrative center.

As a municipal division, the district has been incorporated as Omsukchansky Urban Okrug since January 1, 2015. Prior to that date, the district was incorporated as Omsukchansky Municipal District, which was subdivided into two urban settlements.

Settlements

See also
Dukat mine
Omsukchan Airport

References

Notes

Sources

External links

Districts of Magadan Oblast
States and territories established in 1954